Loganelliidae is an extinct family of thelodonts in the order Thelodontiformes. They are distinguished by the star or cross shaped ridges located on their head scales.

Morphology 
The head scales possess cross shaped or star shaped ridges, transitional scales are rhomboidal, and trunk scales are horizontally elongated. The crown is notably posteriorly pointed, with the apex extending beyond the base. The main crown surface is flat and smooth, and can be inclined in either horizontal direction. The base of the crown possesses a short spine which points downwards and anteriorly.

Classification 
The family contains the following genera:

 Angaralepis
 Illoganellia
 Larolepis
 Loganellia
 Nunavutia
 Sandivia
 Stroinolepis
 Talimaalepis
 Valyalepis

References 

Thelodonti
Prehistoric jawless fish families